The Tijāniyyah is a Sufi tariqa (order, path), originating in the Maghreb but now more widespread in West Africa, particularly in Senegal, The Gambia, Mauritania, Mali, Guinea, Niger, Chad, Ghana, Northern and South-western Nigeria and some part of Sudan. The Tijāniyyah order is also present in the state of Kerala in India. Its adherents are called Tijānī (spelled Tijaan or Tiijaan in Wolof, Tidiane or Tidjane in French).  Tijānīs place great importance on culture and education, and emphasize the individual adhesion of the disciple (murid). To become a member of the order, one must receive the Tijānī wird, or a sequence of holy phrases to be repeated twice daily, from a muqaddam, or representative of the order.

History and spread of the order

Foundation of the order
Ahmad al-Tijani (1737–1815) was born in Aïn Madhi in Algeria and died in Fes, Morocco. He received his religious education in Fes, Morocco. Inspired by other Moroccan saints he founded the Tijānī order in the 1780s; sources vary as to the exact date between 1781 and 1784. Tijānīs, speaking for the poor, reacted against the then-dominant conservative, hierarchical Qadiriyyah brotherhood, focusing on social reform and grassroots Islamic revival.

During the first period, some of al-Tijani's adherents appointed khalifas, established new Tijani centres abroad, and developed ramifications of their own:
 the centres of Sidi Mohammed al-Ghali Boutaleb (d. 1829) and Sidi Alfa Hachim al-Futi (d. 1934) in Medina Munawwara
 the centres of Sidi al-Mufaddal Saqqat, Sidi Mohammed b. Abdelwahid Bannani al-Misri (d. after 1854), and Sidi Mohammed al-Hafidh al-Misri (d. 1983) in Egypt
 the centres of Shaykh al-Islam Sidi Ibrahim Riyahi Tunsi (d. 1851), Sidi Mohammed b. Slimane Manna’i Tunsi, Sidi Mohammed Ben Achour (d. before 1815) and Sidi Taher b. Abdesaadiq Laqmari (d. after 1851) in Tunisia
 the centre of Sidi Uthman Filani Aklani (d. after 1815) in the Sudan,
 the centres of Sidi Mohammed Alawi Chinguiti (d. 1830), Sidi Mawlud Fall (d. 1852) and Sidi Mohammad al-Hafid b. al-Mokhtar Beddi in Mauritania
 the centres of Sidi Mohammed b. al-Mishri Sibai (d. 1809), author of al-Jami’a li-ma f-taraqa mina-l ‘ulumn (The Absolute in What Has Separated from the Sciences), and al-Qutb Sidi Abul Hassan Ali b. Aissa Tamacini (d. 1845) in Algeria

Expansion in West Africa
The order has become the largest Sufi order in West Africa and continues to expand rapidly.  It was brought to southern Mauritania around 1789 by Muḥammad al-Ḥāfiẓ of the 'Idaw `Ali tribe, which was known for its many Islamic scholars and leaders and was predominantly Qādirī at the time.  Nearly the entire tribe became Tijānī during Muḥammad al-Ḥāfiẓ's lifetime, and the tribe's influence would facilitate the Tijāniyya's rapid expansion to sub-Saharan Africa.

Muḥammad al-Ḥāfiẓ's disciple Sidi Mawlūd Vāl initiated the 19th-century Fulbe leader Al-Ḥājj Umar Tall (Allaaji Omar Taal) and the Fulbe cleric `Abd al-Karīm an-Nāqil from Futa Jalon (modern Guinea) into the order. After receiving instruction from Muḥammad al-Ghālī from 1828 to 1830 in Makka, Umar Tall was appointed Khalīfa (successor or head representative) of Aḥmed at-Tijānī for all of the Western Sudan (Western sub-Saharan Africa).  Umar Tall then led a holy war against what he saw as corrupt regimes in the area, resulting in a large but fleeting empire in Eastern Senegal and Mali.  While Umar Tall's political empire soon gave way to French colonialism, the more long-standing result was to spread Islam and the Tijānī Order through much of what is now Senegal, Guinea, and Mali (see Robinson, 1985).

In Senegal's Wolof country, especially the northern regions of Kajoor and Jolof, the Tijānī Order was spread primarily by El-Hajj Malick Sy (spelled "El-Hadji Malick Sy" in French, "Allaaji Maalig Si" in Wolof), born in 1855 near Dagana. In 1902, he founded a zāwiya (religious center) in Tivaouane (Tiwaawan), which became a center for Islamic education and culture under his leadership.  Upon Malick Sy's death in 1922, his son Ababacar Sy (Abaabakar Sy) became the first Khalīfa (Xaliifa).  Serigne Mansour Sy became the present Khalīf in 1997, upon the death of Abdoul Aziz Sy.  The Gàmmu (Mawlid) in Arabic, the celebration of the birth of Muhammad) of Tivaouane gathers many followers each year.

The "house" or branch of Tivaouane is not the only branch of the Tijānī order in Senegal.  The Tijānī order was spread to the south by another jihadist, Màbba Jaxu Ba, a contemporary of Umar Tall who founded a similar Islamic state in Senegal's Saalum area.  After Màbba was defeated and killed at The Battle of Fandane-Thiouthioune fighting against Maad a Sinig Kumba Ndoffene Famak Joof, his state crumbled but the Tijāniyya remained the predominant Sufi order in the region, and Abdoulaye Niass (1840–1922) became the most important representative of the order in the Saalum, having immigrated southward from the Jolof and, after exile in Gambia due to tensions with the French, returned to establish a zāwiya in the city of Kaolack.

The branch founded by Abdoulaye Niass's son, Al-Hadj Ibrahima Niass (Allaaji Ibrayima Ñas, often called "Baye" or "Baay", which is "father" in Wolof), in the Kaolack suburb of Medina Baye in 1930, has become by far the largest and most visible Tijānī branch around the world today.  Ibrahima Niass's teaching that all disciples, and not only specialists, can attain a direct mystical knowledge of God through tarbiyyah rūhiyyah (mystical education) has struck a chord with millions worldwide.  This branch, known as the Tijāniyyah Ibrāhīmiyyah or the Faydah ("Flood"), is most concentrated in Senegal, Nigeria, Ghana, Niger, and Mauritania, and has a growing presence in the United States and Europe.  Most Tijānī web sites and international organizations are part of this movement. Sheikh Ibrahima Niass's late grandson and former Imam of Medina Baye, Shaykh Hassan Cisse, has thousands of American disciples and has founded a large educational and developmental organization, the African American Islamic Institute, in Medina Baye with branches in other parts of the world.

Another Senegalese "house," in Medina-Gounass, Senegal (to the west of the Niokolo Koba park) was created by Mamadou Saidou Ba.
 
Still another in Thienaba, near Thies, was founded by the disciple of a famous marabout of Fouta, Amadou Sekhou.

The Ḥamāliyya (Ḥamālliyya) branch, founded by Shaykh Hamallah, is centered in Nioro, Mali, and is also present in Senegal, Côte d'Ivoire, Burkina Faso, and Niger.  One of its most prominent members is the novelist and historian Amadou Hampâté Bâ, who preserved and advocated the teachings of Tierno Bokar Salif Taal (Cerno Bokar Salif Taal), the "Sage of Banjagara".  (See Louis Brenner, 1984, 2000.)

It was Cherno Muhammadou Jallow, along with Sheikh Oumar Futi Taal, who first received the tarikha Tijaniyya in the Senegambia region. Cherno Muhammadou waited for the tarikha for over twelve years in Saint Louis Senegal, where Sheikh Oumar Futi Taal sent his student Cherno Abubakr. He (Cherno Muhammadou) started spreading it in the Senegambia region. Through oral history, it is that said he (Cherno Muhammadou) passed it to twelve disciples. These disciples range from Mam Mass Kah of Medina Mass Kah, Abdoulaye Niass of Medina Kaolock, Cherno Alieu, Deme of NDiaye Kunda Senegal, Cherno Alieu, Diallo of Djanet in Kolda, to name a few. Through these disciples the tarikha spread through the Senegambia region and beyond. Most of these disciples today have loads of followers and all of them are doing the Laazim daily. Cherno Muhammadou passed it to his son Cherno Omar, who later passed to his son Cherno Muhammadou. Baba Jallow later went on looking for his grandfather (Cherno Muhammadou Jallow), whom he later found in the Casamance. After discovering his grandfather's grave, Cherno Baba created a community and named it Sobouldeh and started an annual Ziarre, where thousands converge to honor him yearly.

Practices

Members of the Tijānī order distinguish themselves by a number of practices.  Upon entering the order, one receives the Tijānī wird from a muqaddam or representative of the order.  The muqaddam explains to the initiate the duties of the order, which include keeping the basic tenets of Islam (including the five pillars of Islam), to honor and respect one's parents, and not to follow another Sufi order in addition to the Tijāniyya.  Initiates are to pronounce the Tijānī wird (a process that usually takes ten to fifteen minutes) every morning and afternoon. The wird is a formula that includes repetitions of lā ʾilāha ʾillā -llāh ("There is no God but Allah"), "Astaghfiru Llāh" ("I ask God for forgiveness"), and a prayer for Muḥammad called the Ṣalātu l-Fātiḥ (Prayer of the Opener).  They are also to participate in the Waẓīfah, a similar formula that is chanted as a group, often at a mosque, or Zawiyah once on a daily basis, as well as in the Ḥaḍarat al-Jumʿah, Hailalat al-Jum'ah another formula chanted among other disciples on Friday afternoon before the sun down.

Additionally, disciples in many areas organize regular meetings, often on Thursday evenings or before or after Waẓīfa and Ḥaḍarat al-Jumʿah, to engage in dhikr Allāh, or remembrance of God.  This consists in repeating the phrase "lā ʾilāha ʾillā -llāh" or simply "Allāh" as a group.  In such meetings, poems praising God, Muhammad, Aḥmed at-Tijānī, or another religious leader may be interspersed with the dhikr. Such meetings may involve simple repetition as a group or call-response, in which one or more leaders lead the chant and others repeat or otherwise respond.

Occasionally, a group of disciples (known in Senegal as a daayira, from Arabic dā'irah, or "circle") may organize a religious conference, where they will invite one or more well known speakers or chanters to speak on a given theme, such as the life of Muḥammad or another religious leader, a particular religious obligation such as fasting during Ramadan, or the nature of God.

The most important communal event of the year for most Tijānī groups is the Mawlid an-nabawī (known in Wolof as the Gàmmu, spelled Gamou in French), or the celebration of the birth of Muḥammad, which falls on the night of the 12th of the Islamic month of Rabīʿ al-'Awwal (which means the night before the 12th, as Islamic dates start at sundown and not at midnight).  Most major Tijānī religious centers organize a large Mawlid event once a year, and hundreds of thousands of disciples attend the largest ones (in Tivaouane, Kaolack, Prang, Kiota, Kano, Fadama, etc.)  Throughout the year, local communities organize smaller Mawlid celebrations.  These meetings usually go from about midnight until shortly after dawn and include hours of dhikr and poetry chanting and speeches about the life of Muḥammad.

See also
Sufism
Wazifa
Lazimi
Salat al-Fatih
Dhikr Jumu'a
List of Sufi orders
Muslim brotherhoods of Senegal
Ahmad At Tijânî Ibn Bâba Al 'Alawî
Sheikh Abubakre Sidiq Bello

References
Brenner, Louis. 2000. "Amadou Hampâté Bâ: Tijânî Francophone." In Triaud and Robinson, 2000.
Davidson, Basil. 1995. Africa in History. New York: Simon & Schuster.
Klein, Martin A. 1968. Islam and Imperialism in Senegal: Sine-Saloum 1847-1914. Stanford: Stanford University Press.
Robinson, David. 1985. The Holy War of Umar Tall. Oxford: Clarendon.
Triaud, Jean-Louis. 2000. "La Tijâniyya, une confrérie musulmane pas comme les autres?"  In Triaud and Robinson, 2000.
Triaud, Jean-Louis and David Robinson, eds. 2000. La Tijâniyya: Une confrérie musulmane à la conquête de l'Afrique.  Paris: Karthala.
WorldStatesmen- here Mali Traditional States
 Jawâhir Ul Ma'ânî du Shaykh 'Alî Al Harâzim, sur le site officiel du Pr. Abdelaziz Benabdallah. Traduit en francais par le Pr.Abdelaziz Benabdallah et son neveu Moustapha Benmoussa.
 Al Boghia : Mataâlib = Requêtes de 'Sidi Larbi Ben Sayeh, sur le site officiel du Pr. Abdelaziz Benabdallah.
 La Tijânia du 'Pr. Abdelaziz Benabdallah, sur le site officiel du Pr. Abdelaziz Benabdallah.
 الشيخ سيدي أحمد التجاني، أبعاد ضلاعته العلمية.بقلم أحمد بن عبد العزيز بن عبد الله, من الموقع الإلكتروني للأستاذ عبد العزيز بن عبد الله.

Notes

External links

Sunni Sufi orders
 
Sufism in Africa
Islam in Senegal
French West Africa
Islam in Nigeria